is Japanese baseball player. Throughout his 22-year career, he has played only with the Hiroshima Toyo Carp.

As of the 2009 season, some of his accomplishments include:

200 home runs (241)
1500 games played (1808)
5000 at bats (5342)
1500 hits (1506) 
900 runs (906)
200 doubles (257)
2500 total bases (2546)
200 stolen bases (268)
600 walks (630)

External links

1968 births
Hiroshima Toyo Carp managers
Hiroshima Toyo Carp players
Japanese expatriate baseball players in the United States
Living people
Managers of baseball teams in Japan
Nippon Professional Baseball outfielders
Peninsula Pilots players
Baseball people from Saga Prefecture